Dolichoderus vexillarius is an extinct species of Eocene ant in the genus Dolichoderus. Described by William Morton Wheeler in 1915, a fossilised worker was found and described from the Baltic amber.

References

†
Oligocene insects
Prehistoric insects of Europe
Fossil taxa described in 1915
Fossil ant taxa